Blue Lagoon: The Awakening is a 2012 American made-for-television romance film that premiered on Lifetime on June 16, 2012. Indiana Evans and Brenton Thwaites star in the film, which is based on the 1908 novel The Blue Lagoon and its previous film adaptations.

It was a major departure from previous Blue Lagoon films in several respects. The setting is contemporary, whereas the previous films were all set in the Victorian era; the lead characters were raised in normal society and are marooned as teenagers, rather than growing up on the island; the island the main characters are stranded on is in the Caribbean, whereas the previous films took place in the Pacific Ocean; and roughly equal time is devoted to the uncivilized world of the island and the human society the characters were born into. Christopher Atkins, the male lead in the 1980 film The Blue Lagoon, also appears in the film.

The film was co-produced by Sony Pictures, whose subsidiary Columbia Pictures financed the 1980 film adaptation and its 1991 sequel, but not the 1949 film version, whose rights are controlled by ITV Studios (successor-in-interest to the Rank Organisation's General Film Distributors, the company that released that version).

Plot
Two high school students, Emma and Dean, are on a class trip to Trinidad to help build a school for less fortunate children. Emma, a popular star pupil, has her life plans set out. The high school quarterback flirts with Emma, though she is instead interested in Dean, a loner who routinely gets into trouble and seldom socializes since his mother's death. After Dean's knife is confiscated, his father pulls strings to get his son back on the trip. On their second night in Trinidad, Dean and Emma separately attend a boat party. During the party, Emma falls overboard when police arrive in a surprise raid. Dean jumps into the water and helps her into a dinghy. Wanting to avoid getting into trouble, Dean severs the line attaching the dinghy to the boat, only to discover there is no motor.

The pair drift to an island, avoiding dangerous rocks, with the dinghy's sole paddle. After discovering the island is deserted, they find the outgoing tide has washed away the dinghy. Unsure if they will be rescued, Emma and Dean must rely on each other for survival. Together, they learn to build a fire, fish, and find food. At first they are friends, but eventually their bond evolves into a romantic relationship. Dean's father, Jack, and Emma's mother, Barbara arrive in Trinidad. Emma reveals that her parents have predetermined her future without her ever questioning it. After an extensive search, the Trinidad government officially ends the effort. Jack and Barbara both keep searching, and Jack hires a private rescue attempt. When Dean and Emma find a human skeleton, Dean calms an upset Emma by kissing her. The two give in to their growing feelings by having sex. The morning after their sexual encounter, Emma finds Dean digging a grave for the skeleton. When questioned, he becomes irritable, but eventually admits he was hoping for closure over his mother's death, suffering guilt for inadvertently causing her fatal accident. With no trace of Emma or Dean being found, Jack and Barbara can no longer neglect their individual responsibilities and both return home. As Emma and Dean's sexual relations continue, they share further intimate details, including a mutual desire to have children, but the difficulty of life on the island and concern about her family increasingly strain Emma.

After being stranded over 100 days, Emma and Dean are rescued by a tourist helicopter. They are met by family, friends, and the media. Emma is thrust into a more popular position at school while Dean, still a semi-outcast, avoids approaching her in public. Readjusting to everyday life, their relationship becomes strained and distant. Emma attends the prom, while Dean only goes because his father encouraged him. Emma spots Dean outside watching her through the window. Emma's friend, Lizzie, encourages her to go to him. Emma and Dean kiss passionately and then dance together.

Cast

Production
The film has been in development since 2004, with Heather Rutman and Matt Heller as writers. The film went into production in 2011 with plans to film in Puerto Rico in February.

Male lead Brenton Thwaites recounted that he had never heard of the Blue Lagoon films before, and upon being cast he watched the previous two films for research, though he admitted that he could not bring himself to watch Return to the Blue Lagoon in its entirety.

During filming of the scenes in the lagoon, Thwaites and co-star Indiana Evans were so cold that they could not talk properly, necessitating that automated dialogue replacement be applied to these scenes.

Production began in California and later moved to the island of Maui in Hawaii.

Reception
Blue Lagoon: The Awakening received more mixed reviews than the previous two films in the franchise, and was often compared favorably to the critically reviled 1980 film. On Metacritic the film has an approval rating of 51 out of 100 based on reviews from 5 critics, indicating "mixed or average reviews".

Linda Stasi commented in the New York Post, "Unlike the original where nudie scenes were followed by fornicating turtles (kill me!), here their 'awakening' is tastefully done with nothing much showing except their emotions." She assessed the film overall as silly but enjoyable. Rob Owen of the Pittsburgh Post-Gazette cited the lack of physical explicitness in the sex scenes as a major weak point of the film, and said the ending was "particularly weak and nonsensical". Mike Hale of The New York Times thought the film was a guilty pleasure, and commented that "the new film lacks the glowing cinematography of Néstor Almendros, who was nominated for an Oscar for The Blue Lagoon. But under the direction of Mikael Salomon and Jake Newsome, The Awakening offers occasional honest moments of humor and adolescent angst: Ms. Evans and Mr. Thwaites are in their early 20s and better actors than Ms. Shields and Mr. Atkins were in their teens." Will Harris of The A.V. Club was highly critical of the film, saying it failed to meet even his low expectations, "When a film manages to fail to live up to the low bar set for Blue Lagoon movies and Lifetime movies, you know you've got something really, really awful on your hands.

See also
 Return to the Blue Lagoon
 The Blue Lagoon (1923 film)
 The Blue Lagoon (1949 film)
 The Blue Lagoon (1980 film)

References

External links
 
 

2010s American films
2010s English-language films
2012 films
2012 romantic drama films
2012 television films
American drama television films
American romantic drama films
American teen romance films
Films about survivors of seafaring accidents or incidents
Films based on works by Henry De Vere Stacpoole
Films directed by Mikael Salomon
Films set in 2012
Films set in California
Films set on uninhabited islands
Films shot in California
Films shot in Hawaii
Juvenile sexuality in films
Lifetime (TV network) films
Reboot films
Sony Pictures direct-to-video films